Paul Moldenhauer (2 December 1876 in Cologne – 1 February 1947) was a German cabinet minister, lawyer, economist and politician (DVP). He served as a German congressman (reichstagsabgeordneter) 1920-1932 and was German Minister of Finance and Minister of Trade and Industry in the late 1920s and early 1930s.

Biography 
Paul Moldenhauer was born in 1876 in Cologne. He studied jurisprudence and political science at the University of Bonn. In 1897 he commenced doctoral studies at the University of Göttingen where he was awarded his Ph.D. in 1899. He also obtained a degree in insurance studies, which at this time was a relatively new and growing subject area. Moldenhauer was thereafter active in the insurance industry until 1902 in Aachen and in Cologne. In 1901 he habilitated (became a Professor Doctor) in insurance studies at the University of Cologne, where he became a member of the faculty of economics.

After the Great War, Moldenhauer returned to the University of Cologne as a faculty member. He also became active in politics and engaged himself in the post-war socio-economical debate.  He undertook several trips to the United States and to England, where he established good relations with academics at leading universities including Princeton, Harvard and Cambridge. Notably, he maintained a dialogue with John Maynard Keynes concerning stimulative fiscal policy.

Moldenhauer was elected in 1919 to the Prussian parliament in Berlin, and in 1920 to the parliament of the Weimar Republic. He remained a member of parliament until June 1930, when he resigned from his post as minister of finance together with several other cabinet ministers following disagreements within the government of Heinrich Brüning regarding the economic and financial policy.

Following his time as a cabinet member and minister of finance, Moldenhauer returned to academia as a professor at the University of Berlin, and later as a board member of companies including Friedrich Krupp AG, Gerling Versicherungs-AG, and Bayer AG.

Paul Moldenhauer was dedicated to stabilising Germany's economy and its relations with France, Great Britain and the United States, and was a leading delegate at the Disarmament Conferences in Den Haag 1930 and Geneva 1932.

Finance Minister of Germany 
On 11 November 1928, Moldenhauer was appointed cabinet member and Minister of Trade and Industry in Chancellor Hermann Müller’s government. Following a cabinet reshuffle he was subsequently appointed minister of finance (Reichsminister der Finanzen). Following Müller’s resignation as Chancellor, Moldenhauer stayed on as minister of finance also in the coalition government of Heinrich Brüning.

Germany's economy was burdened by the enormous war reparations imposed by France in 1921, which were the main factor causing the hyperinflation 1922-23. Between 1923 and 1926,

German Delegate to Disarmament Conventions in Geneva and Den Haag 
Paul Moldenhauer was dedicated to stabilising Germany's economy and its relations with France, Great Britain and the United States, and his policies under the Müller government were orientated toward reconciliation and normalisation. Together with Müller, Stresemann and von Schubert, and subsequently Brüning, Curtius and von Bülow, Finance Minister Moldenhauer was a leading delegate at the Disarmament Conferences in Geneva and Den Haag.

Works
 Das Versicherungswesen, 1905/12, I, 1925, II, 1923
 Die Aufsicht über die privaten Versicherungsunternehmungen, 1903
 Die industriellen und landwirtschaftlichen Haftpflichtversicherungsverbände, 1907
 Internationale Fortschritte der Sozialversicherung, 1912
 Von der Revolution zur Nationalversammlung, Die Frage der rheinisch-westfälischen Republik, 1919
 Die rheinische Republik, 1920
 Grenzgebiete zwischen Feuer- und Transportversicherung, 1921 
 Das Londoner Abkommen und die deutsche Volkswirtschaft, 1924 
 Der künftige Kurs der deutschen Sozialpolitik, 1926 
 Internationale Sozialpolitik, 1927

External links 
 Kurzbiographie in den Akten der Reichskanzlei

1876 births
1947 deaths
Jurists from Cologne
Finance ministers of Germany
University of Göttingen alumni
University of Bonn alumni
German People's Party politicians
German Protestants
Politicians from Cologne